Terrence Lore Smith (1942 – December 7, 1988) was an American mystery writer best known as the author of the best-selling novel The Thief Who Came to Dinner (1969), which was made into the 1973 film of the same name starring Ryan O’Neal and Jacqueline Bisset.

Life 
Born in 1942 in Freeport, Illinois, Smith grew up in Bloomington, Illinois and was the son of Methodist minister Charles Merrill Smith. He married journalist Harriet Hahn on March 20, 1971 in Middletown, New York. The couple, who raised two daughters, moved to Colorado in 1980, where Smith worked as a state-certified drug and alcohol counselor at the rehabilitation centers Brockhurst Ranch and the ARK. He later worked as a courier for the Pikes Peak Library District.

While driving the library van on an icy road, Smith lost control of the vehicle and was hit by another car. He died of injuries related to the accident on December 7, 1988 at the age of 46.

Literary career

The Thief Who Came to Dinner 
Smith's best-known novel, The Thief Who Came to Dinner (1969) peaked at number seven on the list of national best-sellers. The novel tells the story of a computer programmer, Webster McGee, who quits his job to become a jewel thief.

In 1973, the novel was adapted into a movie by Director Bud Yorkin, starring Ryan O'Neal as McGee, and Jacqueline Bisset as McGee's accomplice and love interest, Laura Keane. Warren Oats played David Reilly, an insurance investigator.

Smith published The Devil and Webster Daniels, the sequel to The Thief Who Came to Dinner, in 1975.

Other works 
In addition to The Thief Who Came to Dinner, Smith also co-wrote the three-book "Leo Roi" with his father under the pseudonym Phillips Lore, as well as several other standalone novels.

Smith's novel Yours Truly, from Hell follows a retired military general with psychic powers who travels to London in order to solve the mystery of Jack the Ripper.

Smith was a member of the Mystery Writers Guild of America.

Bibliography 

 The Thief Who Came to Dinner
 The Looking Glass Murders
 Murder Behind Closed Doors
 Yours Truly, From Hell
 The Money War
 The Devil and Webster Daniels
 Grownups and Lovers
 Who Killed the Pie Man?
 Different Drums (1975; with Charles Merrill Smith)

References 

1942 births
1988 deaths
20th-century American novelists
American mystery writers
People from Bloomington, Illinois
People from Freeport, Illinois